Old Madison County Courthouse is a historic courthouse and institutional building located at Morrisville in Madison County, New York.  It is a detached, two-story rectangular frame building measuring 42 feet by 88 feet with a full basement.  It was built in 1865 and expanded to its present size in 1877.  In 1910, the building was acquired by the State of New York for classroom space for the agricultural college established at Morrisville.  It was renamed Madison Hall and used for classrooms, offices, laboratories, the gymnasium, and assembly hall until 1975.

It was added to the National Register of Historic Places in 1978.

References

Courthouses on the National Register of Historic Places in New York (state)
County courthouses in New York (state)
Italianate architecture in New York (state)
Government buildings completed in 1865
National Register of Historic Places in Madison County, New York